Junior Flemmings (born 16 January 1996) is a Jamaican professional footballer who plays as a winger and forward for  club Niort on loan from Toulouse, and the Jamaica national team.

Club career

Early career
Born in Kingston, Jamaica, Flemmings began his career in the youth ranks of Tivoli Gardens.

Tivoli Gardens
In 2013, he made his debut for the first team in the National Premier League. He was unpaid during the 2013 season with Tivoli Gardens to ensure that he wouldn't ruin his chances of playing collegiate soccer in the United States. During the 2015–2016 season Flemmings led Tivoli Gardens in scoring with eight goals, including a late game winner on 23 November 2015 which helped his club to a 2–1 victory over Boys' Town FC.

New York Red Bulls II
After months of speculation, Flemmings signed with New York Red Bulls II of the United Soccer League on 25 March 2016. On 2 April 2016, during his first appearance, Flemmings recorded his first goal and assist with the club in a 2–0 victory against Louisville City. On 22 May 2016, Flemmings scored a late match winner helping New York to a 1–0 victory against FC Montreal. On 12 August 2016, Flemmings helped New York to a 5–1 victory over Orlando City B, scoring one goal and being a constant threat throughout the match.

On 14 April 2017, Flemmings scored his first goal of the season for New York, helping the club to a 3–1 victory over Orlando City B. On 19 August 2017, Flemming scored two goals to help New York to a 4–0 victory over FC Cincinnati. On 2 September 2017, Flemmings  scored one goal and assisted on another in New York's 4–2 victory over Tampa Bay Rowdies.

Tampa Bay Rowdies
In January 2018, Flemmings signed with Tampa Bay Rowdies in the USL.

Phoenix Rising
Flemmings signed with Phoenix Rising in 2019.  He netted sixteen goals and seven assists in his first season with the team, and finished eighth in the league for the Golden Boot, finishing behind teammate and Golden Boot winner Solomon Asante (22 goals).

Flemmings' second season with Phoenix resulted in a Golden Boot Award, scoring 14 goals in a COVID-shortened season. Phoenix was propelled to a first place finish in Group B.

Homophobia controversy
On 30 September 2020, while playing for the Phoenix Rising, Flemmings was accused of using a Jamaican homophobic slur, "batty boy", against the openly gay San Diego Loyal midfielder Collin Martin. The Loyal, who had been leading 3–1 up to that point, walked off the field in protest and forfeited the match. Flemmings denied using the slur and said, in a Twitter statement following the match, that he stands "in solidarity with the LGBTQ+ movement". It was the last time that Flemmings took the pitch for Phoenix Rising. The USL Championship suspended him six games for using "foul and abusive language" and fined him an undisclosed amount. In addition, Phoenix Rising team officials placed Flemmings on administrative leave for the remainder of his contract with the team, which concluded on 30 November 2020. Flemmings' contract with the team was not renewed.

The incident ultimately cost Rising a chance to host the USL Championship Final. Rising and Louisville City FC both finished with 35 points and 11 wins, but Rising had a higher goal differential and would have thus had home-field advantage had it reached the final. However, Rising was only in contention to host the final as a result of the three points it earned by forfeit. Due to the ensuing outcry, Rising announced that if it reached the final, whoever won the Eastern Conference final would have home-field advantage in the Championship Final. They were set to play the Tampa Bay Rowdies in Tampa Bay in that game, but it was canceled due to a COVID outbreak in the Rowdies organization.

Birmingham Legion
On 13 January 2021, Flemmings joined USL Championship side Birmingham Legion.

In the announcement of Flemmings joining Legion, team officials noted his history with homophobia at Phoenix Rising, but said they believe that "second chances provide opportunities for growth." Team officials also said they had "extensive conversations" with Flemmings' former coaches and teammates, in addition to Martin and Donovan for their perspective on the team signing Flemmings. Flemmings also apologized for the incident in the statement.

Toulouse
On 5 January 2022, Flemmings was transferred to Ligue 2 side Toulouse. Toulouse was promoted to Ligue 1 at the end of the 2021–22 season, but Flemmings did not make any appearances in the top tier during the first half of the 2022–23 season.

Loan to Niort
On 31 January 2023, Flemmings was loaned to Niort in Ligue 2 until the end of the 2022–23 season.

International career
Flemmings has represented Jamaica at the U-20 and U-17 national team level, serving as captain of the U-17's.

He received his first full national team call up in November 2015, and was named to the 18-player match roster for Jamaica's 2018 World Cup qualifier against Panama, but was an unused substitute. Flemmings made his senior international debut versus French Guiana in the 2017 Caribbean Cup. Flemmings' scored the match-winning goal against Guadalupe in Jamaica's second group stage match of the 2021 CONCACAF Gold Cup thus qualifying them for the quarterfinals.

Career statistics

Club

International
Scores and results list Jamaica's goal tally first, score column indicates score after each Flemmings goal.

Honors 
New York Red Bulls II
USL Cup: 2016
USL Regular Season: 2016

Phoenix Rising
USL Championship Regular Season: 2019
Western Conference
Winners (Regular Season): 2019
Winners (Playoffs): 2020

Jamaica
Caribbean Cup runner-up: 2017
Toulouse

 Ligue 2: 2021–22

Individual
RSPL Young Player of the Season: 2015–16
USL Championship Golden Boot Winner: 2020

References

External links
 
 jamaicafootballfederation.com
 

1996 births
Sportspeople from Kingston, Jamaica
Living people
Jamaican footballers
Jamaica youth international footballers
Jamaica under-20 international footballers
Jamaica international footballers
Association football forwards
Valencia CF players
Tivoli Gardens F.C. players
New York Red Bulls II players
Tampa Bay Rowdies players
Phoenix Rising FC players
Birmingham Legion FC players
Toulouse FC players
Chamois Niortais F.C. players
National Premier League players
USL Championship players
Ligue 2 players
Championnat National 3 players
2015 CONCACAF U-20 Championship players
2019 CONCACAF Gold Cup players
2021 CONCACAF Gold Cup players
Jamaican expatriate footballers
Jamaican expatriate sportspeople in the United States
Expatriate soccer players in the United States
Jamaican expatriate sportspeople in Spain
Expatriate footballers in Spain
Jamaican expatriate sportspeople in France
Expatriate footballers in France